The Mongol Internationale was the first national anthem of the Mongolian People's Republic, in use from 1924 to 1950.

History 
Following the Mongolian Revolution of 1921, communists managed to gain power and found the Mongolian People's Republic in 1924. With concurrent revolutions in Russia and Tuva also succeeding, the Russian Soviet Federative Socialist Republic and Tuvan People's Republic were formed as well. The former would join with three other republics to form the Soviet Union, adopting "The Internationale" (a popular workers' song used by a wide range of left-wing movements) as its national anthem. In honour of this, composers in Tuva and Mongolia created the Tuvan Internationale and Mongol Internationale. Despite the Mongol Internationale being similar to The Internationale in title, the melody is quite different and unique. Despite this, it and the Tuvan Internationale frequently get confused for Mongolian or Tuvan-language versions of The Internationale. The Internationale does actually have a Mongolian version, however, which should not be confused with the Mongol Internationale.

Lyrics

See also
National anthem of Mongolia
Tuvan Internationale

References 

Anthems
Asian anthems
Socialist International
Mongolian People's Republic